The Speer (1,951 m) is a mountain in the Appenzell Alps, overlooking the region between Lake Zurich and Lake Walenstadt in the canton of St. Gallen.

Being easily accessible, the summit is popular for its panoramic view of the Alps from central to eastern Switzerland. The ascent, however, involves a few hours of hiking.

References

External links

Speer on Summitpost
Speer on Hikr

Mountains of the Alps
Mountains of Switzerland
Mountains of the canton of St. Gallen
Appenzell Alps
One-thousanders of Switzerland